Peter Momber (4 January 1921 – 23 January 1975) was a German footballer who played for Borussia Neunkirchen, 1. FC Saarbrücken, SV St. Ingbert 1945 and the Saarland national team as a defender.

References

1921 births
1975 deaths
German footballers
Saar footballers
Saarland international footballers
Borussia Neunkirchen players
1. FC Saarbrücken players
SV St. Ingbert 1945 players
Association football defenders